Silver Skates is a 1943 American musical film directed by Leslie Goodwins and starring Kenny Baker, Belita and Patricia Morison.

Cast
Kenny Baker as Danny Donovan
Belita as Belita
Patricia Morison as Claire Thomas
Werner Groebli as Frick, Comedy Skating Act Frick and Frack
Hans Mauch as Frack, Comedy Skating Act Frick and Frack
Irene Dare as Juvenile Skater Katrina
Danny Shaw as Juvenile Skater Billy Baxter
Eugene Turner as 1941 National Skating Champion
Joyce Compton as Lucille
Frank Faylen as Eddie
Paul McVey as Roscoe Hayes
John Maxwell as Blake
Henry Wadsworth as Tom
George Stewart as Jitterbug Skater
JoAnn Dean as Jo Ann Dean, Jitterbug Skater
Ted Fio Rito Orchestra as Ted Fio Rito Orchestra
Ruth Lee as Mrs. Martin

References

Bibliography
Michael L. Stephens. Art Directors in Cinema: A Worldwide Biographical Dictionary. McFarland, 1998.

External links

1943 films
1943 musical films
American musical films
Monogram Pictures films
Films directed by Leslie Goodwins
American black-and-white films
1940s English-language films
1940s American films